Streetcars in Washington, D.C. transported people across the city and region from 1862 until 1962.

The first streetcars in Washington, D.C., were drawn by horses and carried people short distances on flat terrain; but the introduction of cleaner and faster electric streetcars, capable of climbing steeper inclines, opened up the hilly suburbs north of the old city and in Anacostia. Several of the district's streetcar lines were extended into Maryland, and two Virginia lines crossed into the district. 

The city experimented briefly with cable cars, but by the beginning of the 20th century, the streetcar system was fully electrified. By 1901, a series of mergers dubbed the "Great Streetcar Consolidation" gathered most local transit firms into two major companies. In 1933, a second consolidation brought all streetcars under one company, Capital Transit. 

Over the next decades, the streetcar system shrank amid the rising popularity of the automobile and pressure to switch to buses. After a strike in 1955, the company changed ownership and became DC Transit, with explicit instructions to switch to buses. The system was dismantled in the early 1960s; the last streetcar ran on January 28, 1962.

Today, some streetcars, car barns, trackage, stations, and rights-of-way exist in various states of usage. Visible remnants of tracks and conduit remain intact in the centers of O and P Streets NW between 33rd and 35th Streets NW in Georgetown. Remnants of tracks and conduit also remain visible near at an M Street door of the Georgetown Car Barn.

History

Early transit in Washington
Public transportation began in Washington, D.C., almost as soon as the city was founded. In May 1800, two-horse stage coaches began running twice daily from Bridge and High Streets NW (now Wisconsin Avenue and M Street NW) in Georgetown by way of M Street NW and Pennsylvania Avenue NW/SE to William Tunnicliff's Tavern at the site now occupied by the Supreme Court Building. Service ended soon after it began.

The next attempt at public transit arrived in the spring of 1830, when Gilbert Vanderwerken's Omnibuses, horse-drawn wagons, began running from Georgetown to the Navy Yard. The company maintained stables on M Street, NW. These lines were later extended down 11th Street SE to the waterfront and up 7th Street NW to L Street NW. Vanderwerken's success attracted competitors, who added new lines, but by 1854, all omnibuses had come under the control of two companies, "The Union Line" and "The Citizen's Line." In 1860, these two merged under the control of Vanderwerken and continued to operate until they were run out of business by the next new technology: streetcars.

Horse-drawn streetcars

Washington and Georgetown

Streetcars began operation in New York City along the Bowery in 1832, but the technology did not really become popular until 1852, when Alphonse Loubat invented a side-bearing rail that could be laid flush with the street surface, allowing the first horse-drawn streetcar lines. The technology began to spread and on May 17, 1862, the first Washington, D.C., streetcar company, the Washington and Georgetown Railroad was incorporated.
The company ran the first streetcar in Washington, D.C., from the Capitol to the State Department starting on July 29, 1862. It expanded to full operations from the Navy Yard to Georgetown on October 2, 1862. Another line opened on November 15, 1862. It was built along 7th Street NW from N Street NW to the Potomac River and expanded to the Arsenal (now Fort McNair) in 1875.  A third line ran down 14th Street NW from Boundary Street NW (now Florida Avenue) to the Treasury Building. In 1863 the 7th Street line was extended north to Boundary Street NW.

Metropolitan
The Washington and Georgetown's monopoly didn't last long. On July 1, 1864, a second streetcar company, the Metropolitan Railroad, was incorporated. It opened lines from the Capitol to the War Department along H Street NW. 

In 1872, the railroad built a line on 9th Street NW and purchased the Union Railroad (chartered on January 19, 1872). It used the Union's charter to expand into Georgetown. In 1873 it purchased the Boundary and Silver Spring Railway (chartered on January 19, 1872) and used its charter to build north on what is now Georgia Avenue.
In June 1874, it absorbed the Connecticut Avenue and Park Railway (chartered on July 13, 1868; operations started in April 1873) and its line on Connecticut Avenue from the White House to Boundary Avenue. By 1888, it had built additional lines down 4th Street NW/SW to P Street SW, and on East Capitol Street to 9th Street.

Columbia
Chartered by Congress on May 24, 1870 and beginning operations the same year, the Columbia Railway was the city's third horse car operator. It ran from the Treasury Building along H Street NW/NE to the city boundary at 15th Street NE.  The company built a car barn and stable on the east side of 15th Street just south of H Street at the eastern end of the line.

Anacostia and Potomac River
The Anacostia and Potomac River Railroad was chartered on May 5, 1870. It wasn't given approval by Congress until February 18, 1875, but it was constructed that year. The streetcars traveled from the Arsenal and crossed the Navy Yard Bridge to Uniontown (now Historic Anacostia) to Nichols Avenue SE (now Martin Luther King Avenue) and V Street SE where a car barn and stables were maintained by the company. In 1888 the Anacostia and Potomac River expanded from the Navy Yard to Congressional Cemetery, and past Garfield Park to the Center Market (now the National Archives) in downtown. It also expanded up Nichols Avenue past the Government Hospital for the Insane (now St. Elizabeths Hospital).

Capitol, North O Street and South Washington
The last streetcar company to begin operation during the horsecar era was the Capitol, North O Street and South Washington Railway. It was incorporated on March 3, 1875, and began operation later that year.  It ran on a circular route around downtown D.C. A P Street NW track was added in 1876. In 1881, the route was extended north and south on 11th Street West and tracks were rerouted across the Mall. It changed its name to the Belt Railway on February 18, 1893.

Horse-drawn chariots and the Herdic Phaeton Company
During this time, streetcars competed with numerous horse-drawn chariot companies. Starting on March 5, 1877, the date of President Hayes' inauguration, single-horse carriages began running on a route roughly parallel to the Washington and Georgetown's Pennsylvania Avenue route. After three years, streetcars forced the chariots out of business.

This was followed almost immediately by the Herdic Phaeton Company.  The electric streetcar, however, was too much for the company to compete with and when its principal stockholder died in 1896, it ceased operations.

After the Herdic Company went under, the Metropolitan Coach Company began running horse-drawn coaches in conjunction with the Metropolitan Railroad, carrying passengers from 16th and T Streets NW to 22nd and G Streets NW. It began operations on May 1, 1897, with a car barn at 1914 E Street NW. In 1904, it became its own corporation.

The switch to electric power
Horsecars, though an improvement over horse drawn wagons, were slow, dirty and inefficient. Horses needed to be housed and fed, created large amounts of waste, had difficulty climbing hills and were difficult to dispose of. Almost as soon as they were instituted, companies began looking for alternatives. For example, the Washington and Georgetown experimented with a steam motor car in the 1870s and 1880s which was run on Pennsylvania Avenue NW near the Capitol several times, but was never placed in permanent use.

In 1883, Frank Sprague, an 1878 Naval Academy graduate, resigned from the Navy to work for Thomas Edison. He began his work in Richmond, Virginia, where, on February 2, 1888, he placed into service the first successful electric streetcar system in the United States. 

After 1888, many cities, including Washington, turned to electric-powered streetcars. Steam engines within power stations turned generators that produced the electricity needed to operate the streetcars. In most such cities (but not Washington), overhead wires installed over streets transmitted electricity from the power stations to long poles mounted on the roofs of the streetcars. A new name was soon developed for streetcars powered by electricity in this manner; they were called trolley cars.

Conversion of Washington's horse cars to mechanical and electrical power

On March 2, 1889, the District's government authorized every streetcar company in Washington to switch from horse power to underground cable or to electricity provided by battery or underground wire. In 1890, the District authorized companies to sell stock to pay for the upgrades - provided that the upgrades did not involve overhead wires. In 1892, one-horse cars were banned within the city, and by 1894 Congress began requiring companies to switch to something other than horse power while continuing to disallow overhead lines within the city.

New electric streetcar companies

Eckington and Soldiers' Home

By 1888, Washington was expanding north of Boundary Street NW into the hills of Washington Heights and Petworth. Boundary Street was becoming such a misnomer that in 1890 it was renamed Florida Avenue.

Climbing the hills to the new parts of the city was difficult for horses, but electric streetcars could do it easily. In the year following the successful demonstration of the Richmond streetcar, four electric streetcar companies were incorporated in Washington, D.C.  

The Eckington and Soldiers' Home Railway was the first to charter, on June 19, 1888, and started operation on October 17. Its tracks started at 7th Street and New York Avenue NW, east of Mount Vernon Square, and traveled 2.5 miles to the Eckington Car Barn at 4th and T Streets NE via Boundary Street NE, Eckington Place NE, R Street NE, 3rd Street NE and T Street NE. 

Another line ran up 4th Street NE to Michigan Avenue NE. A one-week pass cost $1.25. In 1889, the line was extended along T Street NE, 2nd Street NE and V Street NE to Glenwood Cemetery, but the extension proved unprofitable and was closed in 1894. 

At the same time, an extension was built along Michigan Avenue NE to the B&O railroad tracks. In 1895, the company removed its overhead trolley lines in accordance with its charter and attempted to replace them with batteries. These proved too costly and the company replaced them with horses in the central city. 

In 1896, Congress directed the Eckington and Soldier's Home to try compressed air motors and to substitute underground electric power for all its horse and overhead trolley lines in the city. The compressed-air motors were a failure and in 1899 the company switched to the standard underground electric power conduit.

Rock Creek
The Rock Creek Railway was the second electric streetcar incorporated in D.C. It was incorporated in 1888 and started operations in 1890 on two blocks of Florida Avenue east of Connecticut Avenue. After completing a bridge over Rock Creek at Calvert Street on July 21, 1891, the line was extended through Adams Morgan and north on Connecticut Avenue to Chevy Chase Lake, Maryland. In 1893, a line was added through Cardozo/Shaw to 7th Street NW.

Georgetown and Tenleytown
The third electric streetcar company to incorporate, the Georgetown and Tenleytown Railway, was chartered on August 22, 1888. In 1890, the railway started operations connecting Georgetown to the extant village of Tenleytown. The line traveled the length of the Georgetown and Rockville Road (now Wisconsin Avenue NW), stretching from the Potomac River to the Maryland state line. In 1890 it was extended across the Maryland line to Bethesda. 

In 1897, the Washington and Rockville Railway was formed to extend the line to Rockville. Though the two companies legally acted as different entities, they traveled identical routes on identical rails and shared a car barn (owned by WRECo) on Wisconsin Avenue NW at the District boundary. By 1900, the tracks had extended to Rockville.

Washington and Great Falls - Maryland and Washington

Two more Washington D.C. streetcar companies operating in Maryland were incorporated by acts of Congress in the summer of 1892. Congress approved the Washington and Great Falls Electric Railway Company's charter on July 28, 1892, permitting the company to build an electric streetcar line from Georgetown to Cabin John, Maryland. Its tracks reached the District–Maryland line on September 28, 1895 and Cabin John in 1897.

Congress approved the Maryland and Washington Railway's charter on August 1, 1892. That railroad's tracks ran on Rhode Island Avenue NE from 4th Street NE reaching what is now Mount Rainier on the Maryland line in 1897. At its southern terminus it connected to the Eckington and Soldier's Home.

Capital Railway
The first electric streetcar to operate in Anacostia was the Capital Railway. It was incorporated by Colonel Arthur Emmett Randle on March 2, 1895, to serve Congress Heights. It was to run from Shepherds Ferry along the Potomac and across the Navy Yard Bridge to M Street SE. 

A second line would run along Good Hope Road SE to the District boundary. The line was built during the Panic of 1896 despite 18 months of opposition from the Anacostia and Potomac River. In 1897 it experimented with the "Brown System", which used magnets in boxes to relay power instead of overhead or underground lines, and with double trolley lines over the Navy Yard Bridge. Both were failures. 

By 1898, the streetcar line ran along Nichols Avenue SE to Congress Heights, ending at Upsal Street SE. At the same time the Capital Railway was incorporated, the Washington and Marlboro Electric Railway was chartered to run trains across the Anacostia River through southeast Anacostia to the District boundary at Suitland Road and from there to Upper Marlboro, but it never laid any track.

Baltimore and Washington
The Baltimore and Washington Transit Company was incorporated prior to 1894, with authorization to run from the District of Columbia, across Maryland to the Pennsylvania border. On June 8, 1896, it was given permission to enter the District of Columbia and connect to the spur of the Brightwood that ran on Butternut St NW. 

In 1897, the railroad began construction on a line, known locally as the Dinky Line, that began at the end of the Brightwood spur at 4th and Butternut Streets NW, traveled south on 4th Street NW to Aspen Street NW and then east on Aspen Street NW and Laurel Street NW into Maryland. Later, between 1903 and 1917, a line was added running south on 3rd St NW and west on Kennedy St NW to Colorado Avenue where it connected to Capital Traction's 14th Street line. On March 14, 1914, it changed its name to the Washington and Maryland Railway.

East Washington Heights
The East Washington Heights Traction Railroad was incorporated on June 18, 1898.  By 1903 it ran from the Capitol along Pennsylvania Avenue SE to Barney Circle, and by 1908, it went across the bridge to Randle Highlands (now known as Twining) as far as 27th St SE. By 1917 it had been extended out Pennsylvania Avenue past 33rd Street SE., but the company ceased operations by 1923.

Washington, Spa Spring, and Gretta
The last new streetcar company to form was the Washington, Spa Spring and Gretta Railroad. It was chartered by the state of Maryland on February 13, 1905, and authorized to enter the District on February 18, 1907. Construction began by March 22, 1908.

In 1910, the company began running cars along a single track from a modest waiting station and car barn near 15th Street NE and H Street NE along Bladensburg Road NE to Bladensburg. [On July 5, 1892, the District of Columbia Suburban Railway was incorporated to run streetcars along the same route - on Bladensburg Road NE from the Columbia tracks on H Street NE to the Maryland line and from Brookland to Florida Avenue NE, but it was never constructed]. 

Although initially planned to go as far as Gettysburg, Pennsylvania, the line never ran further than an extension to Berwyn Heights, Maryland. The route was planned to promote development of company-owned land adjacent to the tracks, but it never successfully competed with established rail lines in the same area. Noting its diminished ambitions, it became the Washington Interurban Railway on October 12, 1912, and changed the Railway to Railroad in 1919.

Washington and Georgetown
After the March 2, 1889, D.C. law passed, the Washington and Georgetown began installing an underground cable system. Their 7th Street line switched to cable car on April 12, 1890. The rest of the system switched to cable by August 18, 1892. In 1892, they extended their track along 14th to Park Road NW.

Brightwood
On October 18, 1888, the day after the Eckington and Soldier's Home began operation, Congress authorized the Brightwood Railway to electrify the Metropolitan's streetcar line on Seventh Street Extended NW or Brightwood Avenue NW (now known as Georgia Avenue NW) and to extend it to the District boundary at Silver Spring. In 1890 they bought the former Boundary and Silver Spring line from the Metropolitan, but continued to operate it as a horse line. In 1892 it was ordered by Congress to switch to overhead electrical power and complete the line. The next year, the streetcar tracks reached Takoma Park via a spur along Butternut Street NW to 4th Street NW. In 1898, the Brightwood was ordered to switch to underground electric power on pain of having its charter revoked.

Metropolitan
The Metropolitan experimented with batteries in 1890 but found them unsatisfactory. On August 2, 1894, Congress ordered the Metropolitan to switch to underground electrical power. It complied, installing the underground sliding shoe on the north–south line in January 1895. The Metropolitan switched the rest of the system to electric power on July 7, 1896. In 1895, the Metropolitan built a streetcar barn near the Arsenal and a loop in Georgetown to connect it to the Georgetown Car Barn. In 1896 it extended service along East Capitol Street and built the East Capitol Street Car Barn. and extended its service to Mount Pleasant.

Columbia

The Columbia decided to try a cable system, the last cable car system built in the United States. They built a new cable car barn and began operating the system on March 9, 1895. It became clear that the underground electrical system was superior, so it quickly abandoned cable cars and switched to electrical power on July 22, 1899. The last cable car in the city ran the next day.

Using electricity from the power plant built to power its cable operation, the Columbia won permission in 1898 to build a line east along Benning Road NE, splitting on the east side of the Anacostia. One branch ran to Kenilworth, and the other, built in 1900, connected at Seat Pleasant with the terminus of the steam-powered Chesapeake Beach Railway.

Belt
In 1896 the Belt Railway tried out compressed air motors.  The compressed air motors were a failure, and in 1899 the cars were equipped with the standard underground power system.

Anacostia and Potomac River
The Anacostia and Potomac River switched from horses to electricity in April 1900. This was the last horse-drawn streetcar to run in the District.

Virginia trolleys operating in Washington, D.C.
Two electric trolley companies serving Northern Virginia also operated in the District and a third received permission to do so, but never did so (see:  Northern Virginia trolleys):

The Washington & Arlington Railway was the first Virginia company given permission to operate in Washington. It was incorporated on February 28, 1892, with the right to run a streetcar from the train station at 6th Street NW and B Street NW to Virginia across a new Three Sisters Bridge. It was also allotted space in the Georgetown Car Barn. The company was never able to construct the new bridge, and so never operated in Washington.

The Washington, Alexandria, and Mount Vernon Electric Railway began operating between Alexandria and Mount Vernon in 1892. On August 23, 1894, it was given permission to enter the District of Columbia using a boat or barge.  However, the railroad never actually used any such watercraft.

The railroad completed its tracks in 1896 and began serving a waiting station at 14th Street NW and B Street NW. From the waiting station it used the Belt Line Street Railway Company's tracks on 14th Street NW to reach the Long Bridge, a combined road and rail crossing of the Potomac River. In 1906, the Long Bridge's road and streetcar tracks were relocated to a new truss bridge (the Highway Bridge), immediately west of the older bridge. This span was removed in 1967.

In 1902, the railroad moved its station, as the Belt Line's tracks were circling the block containing the site of a planned new District Building (now the John A. Wilson Building).  The new station (address: 1204 N. Pennsylvania Avenue) extended along 12th Street NW from Pennsylvania Avenue NW to D Street NW, near the site of the present Federal Triangle Metro station and on the opposite side of 12th Street from the Post Office building.

On October 17, 1910, the Washington and Arlington, by then the Washington, Arlington & Falls Church Railroad, and the Washington, Alexandria and Mount Vernon merged to form the Washington–Virginia Railway. The company had difficulty competing and in 1924 declared bankruptcy. In 1927 the two companies were split and sold at auction. The former Washington, Arlington & Falls Church Railroad reemerged as the Arlington and Fairfax Railway and continued to serve the city on the Washington-Virginia route until January 17, 1932, when the Mt. Vernon Memorial Highway (now the George Washington Memorial Parkway) opened. 

The Great Falls and Old Dominion Railroad was chartered on January 24, 1900, and authorized to enter the District on January 29, 1903. It crossed over the Aqueduct Bridge and terminated at a station immediately west of the Georgetown Car Barn. In 1912, it was incorporated into the new Washington and Old Dominion Railway and became the Great Falls Division of that company.

The Great Streetcar Consolidation

By the mid-1890s, there were numerous streetcar companies operating in the District. Congress tried to deal with this fractured transit system by requiring them to accept transfers, set standard pricing and by allowing them to use one another's track. But eventually, lawmakers settled on consolidation as the best solution.

On March 1, 1895, Congress authorized the Rock Creek to purchase the Washington and Georgetown on September 21, producing the Capital Traction Company. In 1916 Capital Traction took ownership of the Washington and Maryland and its 2.591 miles of track.

After Capital Traction's powerhouse at 14th and E NW burned down on September 29, 1897, the company replaced the cable cars with an electric system. The 14th Street branch switched to electric power on February 27, 1898, the Pennsylvania Avenue division on April 20, 1898, and the 7th Street branch on May 26, 1898.

The Anacostia and Potomac River began expanding on June 24, 1898, by purchasing the Belt Railway; the next year, it bought the Capital Railway.

Later that year, the Eckington and Soldier's Home purchased the Maryland and Washington. On June 27, 1898, the new, combined company changed its name to the City and Suburban Railway of Washington. Later that year, it bought the Columbia and Maryland Railway, which ran from Mount Rainier to Laurel.

Between 1896 and 1899, three businessmen purchased controlling interests in the Metropolitan; the Columbia; the Anacostia and Potomac River; the Georgetown and Tennallytown; the Washington, Woodside and Forest Glen; the Washington and Great Falls; and the Washington and Rockville railway companies, in addition to the Potomac Electric Power Company and the United States Electric Lighting Company. They incorporated the Washington Traction and Electric Company on June 5, 1899, as a holding company for these interests.  But the holding company had borrowed too heavily and paid too much for the subsidiaries and quickly landed in financial trouble. 

To prevent transit disruption, Congress on June 5, 1900, authorized the Washington and Great Falls to acquire the stock of any and all of the railways and power companies owned by Washington Traction. When Washington Traction defaulted on its loans on June 1, 1901, Washington and Great Falls moved in to take its place. On February 4, 1902, Washington and Great Falls changed its name to the Washington Railway and Electric Company (WR&E), reincorporated as a holding company and exchanged stock in Washington Traction and Electric one for one for stock in the new company (at a discounted rate).

Not every company became a part of the WR&E immediately. The City and Suburban Railway and the Georgetown and Tennallytown operated as subsidiaries of the WR&E until October 31, 1926, when it purchased the remainder of their stock.

During this time the streetcar companies continued to expand both trackage and service. The American Sight-Seeing Car and Coach Company started running tourist cars along the  WR&E streetcar tracks in 1902 and continued until it switched to large automobiles in 1904. In 1908, the WR&E's U Street line was extended east down Florida Avenue NW/NE to 8th Street NE, and from there south down 8th Street NE/SE to the Navy Yard. On June 24, 1908, the first streetcars began service to Union Station along Delaware Avenue NE and by December 6 cars of both Capital Traction and the WR&E were serving the building along Massachusetts Avenue NE.

In 1908, the Washington, Baltimore and Annapolis Electric Railway began service from Washington to Baltimore and Annapolis. Though technically an interurban, this railway utilized streetcar tracks from its terminal at 15th and H Streets NE and across the Benning Road Bridge where it switched to its own tracks in Deanwood. It was the main source of transportation to Suburban Gardens, known as "the black Glen Echo", the first and only major amusement park within Washington.

The next major consolidation occurred on August 31, 1912, when the WR&E purchased the controlling stock of the Anacostia and Potomac River. This left six companies operating in Washington, four of which had less than 3 miles of track. It also led to Congress passing the "Anti-Merger Act", prohibiting mergers without Congress' approval and establishing the Public Utilities Commission. In 1914 a failed attempt was made to have the Federal Government purchase all of the streetcar lines and companies.
Streetcars were unionized in 1916 when local 689 of the Amalgamated Association of Street, Electric Railway and Motor Coach Employees of America won recognition after a three-day strike.

Further consolidation came in the form of the North American Company, a transit and public utility holding company. North American began to acquire WR&E stock in 1922, gaining a controlling interest by 1928. By December 31, 1933, it owned 50.016% of the voting stock. North American tried to purchase Capital Traction, but never owned more than 2.5% of Capital Traction stock.

Bustitution and competition
By 1916 streetcar use was reaching its peak in Washington, D.C. The combined systems had over 200 miles of track, with almost 100 in the city. Passengers could travel to Great Falls, Glen Echo, Rockville, Kensington and Laurel in Maryland; and to Mount Vernon, Alexandria, Vienna, Fairfax,  Leesburg, Great Falls and Bluemont in Virginia. World War I saw further increases in passenger traffic. But the streetcars were also under increasing threat from competition.

The first threat to the streetcars came with the introduction of gasoline powered taxicabs. The taximeter, invented in 1891, combined with the combustion engine, created a new form of public transportation. Taxicabs were put into service in Paris in 1899, in New York in 1907 and in Washington in 1908. Over the years, their numbers expanded.
Taxis based and operating in the boundaries of the District of Columbia charged their fares with a zone system instead of taximeters, a system which lasted until 2008.
 
In 1909 the Metropolitan Coach Company began to switch from horse-drawn coaches to gasoline-powered coaches - replacing its entire system by 1913 - becoming a precursor to the bus companies.  It was a financial failure though and on August 13, 1915, the company ceased operations.

The gasoline-powered bus was invented in Germany in 1895 and motorized buses were introduced in New York City in 1905. As improvements, such as balloon tires, were made, buses became more popular. The first formal bus company in Washington, the Washington Rapid Transit Company, was incorporated on January 20, 1921. By 1932 it was carrying 4.5% of transit customers. Two years later, the last streetcar line was built.

Just as the horse cars had replaced carriages and the electric streetcar replaced horse cars, so too  were buses to replace the electric streetcars.

In 1923, the number of streetcar companies operating in Washington cut in half as three companies switched to buses. The East Washington Heights became the first streetcar company to switch, replacing its two streetcars and one mile of track with a bus line. The Washington Interurban switched next and its tracks were removed when Bladensburg Road was repaved.  The same year, the decaying Aqueduct Bridge between Georgetown and Rosslyn, which had tracks on it, was replaced by the Key Bridge, which did not.  As a result, the Washington and Old Dominion Railway gave up rail access into DC, moving its terminal to Rosslyn.

When electric streetcars began, several lines also delivered freight on rail cars running on their lines. Capital Traction abandoned this service in 1931.

In 1932, the Arlington and Fairfax Motor Transportation Company was established to replace the streetcar service of the Arlington and Fairfax which lost the right to use the Highway Bridge. The last Arlington and Fairfax streetcar departed from 12th Street NW and D Street NW, on January 17, 1932, abandoning all streetcar service in the city.

In the summer of 1935, after consolidation, several major lines were converted from streetcars to buses. The line from Friendship Heights to Rockville (formerly the Washington and Rockville), the P Street line (Metropolitan), the Anacostia-Congress Heights line (Capital Railway) and the Connecticut Avenue line in Chevy Chase (Rock Creek) were all replaced with buses.  At the same time, the Chesapeake Beach Railway and the Washington, Baltimore and Annapolis interurban ceased operations.

With further bustitution, the Columbia Railway Company Car Barn was converted to a bus barn in 1942.

Monopoly

On December 1, 1933, the WR&E, Capital Traction, and Washington Rapid Transit merged to form the Capital Transit Company. The WR&E continued as a holding company, owning 50% of Capital Transit and 100% of Potomac Electric Power Company (PEPCO), but Capital Traction was dissolved. For the first time, street railways in Washington were under the management of one company.

Capital Transit made several changes. As part of the merger, the Capital Traction generating plant in Georgetown was closed (and, in 1943, decommissioned) and Capital Transit used only conventionally supplied electric power. In 1935, it closed several lines and replaced them with bus service. 

Because the Rockville line in Maryland was one of the lines that was closed, the Capital Transit Community Terminal was opened at Wisconsin Avenue NW and Western Avenue NW on August 4, 1935. At the same time, the car barn on the west side of Wisconsin at Ingomar was razed and replaced with the Western Bus Garage.

In 1936, the system introduced route numbers. On August 28, 1937, the first PCC streetcars began running on 14th Street NW.  By early 1946, the company would place in service 489 of the streamlined, modern PCC model and, in the early 1950s, become the first in the nation to have an all-PCC fleet.

During the 1930s, city newspapers began pushing for streetcar tunneling. The Capitol Subway was built in 1906 and three years later, the Washington Post called for a citywide subway to be built. Nothing happened until Capital Transit took over.

At first, business was good for the new company. During World War II, gasoline rationing limited automobile use, but transit companies were exempt from the rationing.  Meanwhile, wage freezes held labor costs in check. With increased revenue and steady costs, Capital Transit conservatively built up a $7 million cash reserve. In 1945 Capital Transit had America's 3rd largest streetcar fleet. (A map of the system in 1948)

In 1946 in a decision by the United States Supreme Court in North American Co. v. Securities and Exchange Commission, the Supreme Court upheld the Public Utility Holding Company Act of 1935 and forced North American, because it also owned the Potomac Electric Power Co., to sell its shares of Capital Transit. Buyers were hard to come by, but on September 12, 1949, Louis Wolfson and his three brothers purchased from North American 46.5% of the company's stock for $20 per share and the WR&E was dissolved.  For $2.2 million they bought a company with $7 million in cash.

The Wolfsons began paying themselves huge dividends until, in 1955, the war chest was down to $2.7 million. During the same period, transit trips dropped by 40,000 trips per day and automobile ownership doubled.

On December 29, 1954, Capital Transit lost one of its last freight customers when the East Washington Railway took over the delivery of coal from the B&O to the PEPCO power plant at Benning. Previously this had been done using Capital Transit's steeple-cab electric locomotives operating over a remnant of the Benning car line.

D.C. Transit
In January 1955 the Capital Transit Company, then consisting of 750 buses and 450 streetcars, sought permission for a fare increase, but was denied. So that spring, when employees asked for a raise, there was no money available and the company refused to increase pay.

Frustrated, employees went on strike on July 1, 1955. The strike, only the third in D.C. history and the first since a three-day strike in 1945, lasted for seven weeks. Commuters were forced to hitch rides and walk in the brutal summer heat.

On July 18, 1956, after Wolfson dared the Senate to revoke his franchise claiming no other entrepreneur would take the company on, the 84th United States Congress did just that. On July 24, 1956, Public Law 84-757 (An Act to grant a franchise to D. C. Transit System, Inc., and for other purposes) was approved. Soon afterwards, O. Roy Chalk, a New York financier who owned a controlling interest in Trans Caribbean Airways bought the franchise for $13.5million (equivalent to $million in ).  

During the summer of 1970, D.C. Transit "...came under fire from a group of its African American drivers for discrimination in promotions and assignments". There were specific complaints about a lack of black leadership.

On January 3, 1971, Chalk appointed an African American, Robert W. Dickerson, Jr. to the position of Superintendent of Operating Personnel. The first black to lead D.C. Transit, Dickerson joined the company as a bus operator after completing college and serving in the U.S. Army. He then rose through the ranks from Depot Clerk to Acting Coordinator of Operating Personnel before being appointed to the leadership position.

Abandonment
As part of the deal selling Capital Transit to O. Roy Chalk, he was required to replace the system with buses by 1963. Chalk fought the retirement of the streetcars but was unsuccessful, and the final abandonment of the streetcar system began on September 7, 1958, with the end of the North Capitol Street (Route 80) and Maryland (Route 82) lines. On January 3, 1960, the Glen Echo (Route 20), Friendship Heights (Route 30) & Georgia Avenue (Routes 70, 72, 74) streetcar lines were abandoned and the Southern Division (Maine Avenue) Car Barn was closed. This technically ended "trolley" cars in D.C. as only conduit operations remained. On December 3, 1961, the streetcar lines to Mount Pleasant (Routes 40, 42) and 11th Street (Route 60) were abandoned.

The remaining system, including lines to the Navy Yard, the Colorado Avenue terminal, and the Bureau of Engraving (Routes 50, 54) and to the Calvert Street Loop, Barney Circle, and Union Station (Routes 90, 92) was shut down in January 1962.  Early on the morning of Sunday, January 28, 1962, preceded by cars 1101 and 1053, car 766 entered the Navy Yard Car Barn for the last time, and Washington's streetcars became history. The last scheduled run, filled with enthusiasts and drunken college students, left 14th and Colorado at 2:17am and arrived at Navy Yard ten minutes late at 3:05am. One last special trip, carrying organized groups of trolley enthusiasts, set out after that and returned at 4:45am. By the afternoon of the 28th, workers began tearing out the streetcar tracks and platforms along 14th Street.

Remnants

Street cars
 

After the system was abandoned, several hundred cars were cut in half at the center door and scrapped. Others were sold: 101 to Barcelona where some continued in service until 1971; 71 to Sarajevo where they ran until 1983 and nine were converted to the only articulated PCC streetcars; and 15 to Fort Worth, Texas, where they ran on the Tandy Center Subway until it shut down in 2002.

About 20 streetcars remain in existence, none in active daily operation. One Capital Transit PCC car has been restored and operates occasional special service in Sarajevo. One of the trams sold to Fort Worth, Capital Transit 1551, was repainted and transferred to the McKinney heritage streetcar in Dallas in 2002, but has been out of service since 2006 with mechanical and electrical problems.

Others serve as museum pieces. The only Washington streetcar still in the District is Capital Traction 303, on display in the Smithsonian's National Museum of American History. The Smithsonian also preserved Washington and Georgetown 212. The car is in storage at the Smithsonian's facility in Suitland, Maryland. 

Others are preserved, in various conditions, at the National Capital Trolley Museum in Colesville, Maryland, including D.C. Transit/Capital Transit 1101, 1430, and 1540; Capital Traction 522, 27 (ex-DC Transit 766) and 09; and WR&E 650. Three more were destroyed in a fire on September 28, 2003. In July 2020, the museum acquired DC Transit 1470 from the Virginia Museum of Transportation in Roanoke, Virginia.  

Farther from D.C., Capital Transit 010 (a snow sweeper) is in the collection of the Connecticut Trolley Museum. D.C. Transit 1304 is at the Seashore Trolley Museum in Kennebunkport, Maine.
 
Three of the Ft. Worth cars are held in storage by North Texas Historic Transportation with plans to place them in a yet-to-be-built museum. One of the Tandy Center cars is preserved by Leonard's Museum. Two of the Barcelona cars are privately owned and stored in Madrid, Spain and Ejea de los Caballeros, Spain. Another two are in the Museu del Transport in Castellar de n'Hug, Spain.

Tracks
Much of the track in D.C. was removed and sold for scrap. The complex trackwork on Capitol Plaza in front of Washington Union Station was removed in the mid-1960s. The Pennsylvania Avenue NW trackwork between the Capitol and the Treasury Building was removed during the street's mid-1980s redevelopment. Elsewhere, the track was buried under pavement. 

The loop tracks of the former Capital Transit connection, behind the closed restaurant on Calvert Street NW, immediately east of the Duke Ellington Bridge, are extant under asphalt. The tracks on Florida Avenue also exist under pavement (as shown by the eternal seam above the conduit). Tracks also exist under Ellington Place NE, 3rd Street NE, 8th Street SE, and elsewhere. In 1977, the tracks on M Street and Pennsylvania Avenue in and near Georgetown were paved over. 

Visible remnants of the Metropolitan Railroad's Georgetown tracks and conduit remain intact in the centers of the cobblestoned blocks of O and P Streets NW between 33rd and 35th Streets NW. Remnants of tracks and conduit also remain visible near an M Street door of the Georgetown Car Barn.

Car barns and shops
Some car barns, or car houses as they were later known, survived in part or in whole.

 The Washington and Georgetown Car Barn (later known as the M Street Shops) at 3222 M Street NW, which had served as stables for Gilbert Vanderwerken's omnibus line, a streetcar garage and maintenance shop and as a tobacco warehouse, was turned into a mall known as The Shops at Georgetown Park in 1981. Only the facade of the original car barn remains.
 The Washington and Georgetown Railroad Company Car Barn at 1346 Florida Avenue NW, originally built in 1877 and sold in 1892, is known today as the west building of the Manhattan Laundry. It served as the home to the Booker T. Washington Public Charter School from 1999 to 2014. It's now home to the Franklin Hall bar, Maydan restaurant and La Colombe coffee. 
 The original Eckington Car Barn at 400 T Street NE burned down before 1920 and a new one was built to replace it. That building is now a postal vehicle maintenance facility.

 The Navy Yard Car Barn (officially the Washington and Georgetown Railroad Car House and colloquially "The Blue Castle") at 770 M Street SE is the sole surviving artifact of the cable car era.  Its building has served as a bus garage and in 2021 was home to the Richard Wright Public Charter School.  

In 2005, Preferred Real Estate Investments, Inc., bought the building and made plans to use it for retail space. In January 2008, Madison Marquette Real Estate Services purchased the building, held it as an investment and used its space for offices. In 2014, Madison Marquette sold the building to the National Community Church, which renovated it, renamed it to "The Capital Turnaround" and made plans to use its space for an indoor marketplace, a child development center and a 1000-seat event space where the church would conduct services.

 The Georgetown Car Barn at 3600 M Street NW, with "Capital Traction Company" still written above the main door, now serves as classroom and administrative space for Georgetown University. It includes the famous "Exorcist steps" that connect Prospect Street NW to M Street NW. O. Roy Chalk owned the building until 1992 when the Minneapolis-based Lutheran Brotherhood took possession of the property in a foreclosure. Developer Douglas Jemal bought it in May 1997.
 The East Capitol Street Car Barn, at 1400 East Capitol Street NE, was used as a bus barn from 1962 to 1973 and then sat vacant until it was turned into condominiums.
 The Decatur Street Car Barn (a.k.a. the Capital Traction Company Car Barn or Northern Carhouse), at 4615 14th Street NW, was built in 1906 and is now used as a Metrobus barn. One of three designed by Waddy Wood, it is the only car barn still used for transit.

 Benning Car House, the red brick building at the northeast corner of Benning Road & Kenilworth Avenue on the grounds of PEPCO's Benning Road Power Plant, was built in 1941 and went out of service with the conversion of this carline to buses on May 1, 1949. The building has been structurally modified and still stands.
Grace Street Power House, at 3221 Grace Street. Built in 1917 by the D.C. Paper Manufacturing Company, the three-bay brick-and-steel structure was built to serve as the power house for the paper company. By 1919, the paper company was using a different power house and this one was purchased by the Capitol Traction Company, to use as a store room.

Other car barns were demolished.
 The Anacostia and Potomac River Car Barn at Martin Luther King Jr. Avenue SE and V Street SE is gone.
 The Columbia Railway Car Barn in Trinidad served as a bus barn until it was demolished in 1971 and replaced with apartments.
 The Metropolitan Street Railway Car Barn (a.k.a. the Seventh Street-Wharves Barn) and the adjacent shops on 4th Street SW were torn down in 1962 to make room for the Riverside Condominiums.
 The Tenleytown Car Barn (a.k.a. Western Carhouse or Tennally Town Car Barn), the first car barn and powerhouse for the Tennallytown line, was built around 1897 at what is now the intersection of Wisconsin Avenue NW and Calvert Street NW. It was removed sometime before 1920 and replaced around 1935. This second structure was removed before 1958.
 The Capital Traction Company Powerhouse in Georgetown was torn down in 1968; the land it sat on is now part of the Georgetown Waterfront Park.
 Falls Barn, near Georgetown University, was demolished between 1948 and 1958.
 A car barn was built in Mount Pleasant around 1892, but it was gone by 1948.
 A barn was built at 2411 P Street NW by the Metropolitan around 1870 and served as stables, a power house, car barn and repair shops. Much of the property was destroyed when Q Street was extended, but the remainder lasted until at least 1920.
 The  Brightwood Car House, at 5929 Georgia Avenue NW, was built in 1909 as a car barn and electric generation substation to replace a 'car stable' that burned down on January 16, 1898. It was designed by the engineer W.B. Upton who also designed the Eckington car barn. In 1955 PEPCO sold the car barn, and it ceased operation as a streetcar facility. 

The car barn became the showroom and service center for Hicks Chevrolet which modified the facade. In 1976 the dealership was sold and became Curtis Chevrolet. Curtis Chevrolet closed on November 30, 2007, and was sold to Foulger-Pratt for redevelopment. Though the D.C. Historical Preservation Society asked Foulger-Pratt to reuse, not destroy, the car house, in 2010, Walmart announced that they planned to raze the car barn and build a store on the site, to open in 2012. 

Plans by Walmart to bring the entire structure down were approved and demolition began on September 6, 2011. Demolition was shortly thereafter halted for a historical preservation review, but historic designation was denied and the entire structure came down in March 2012. The Walmart opened on December 2, 2013. The new structure included bricks and trusses from the original car barn, which is all that remains of it.

Stations and loops

A few stations and terminals have survived. Sometime after conversion of the Mt. Pleasant Line in December 1961, the Dupont Circle streetcar stations were used as a civil defense storage area for a few years and then left empty again. 

The space was once considered for a columbarium. In 1993 one of the stations was opened as a food court called DuPont Down Under, but after only 18 months it closed. 

In 2007, D.C. Council member Jim Graham began consideration of a suggestion to allow adult-themed clubs to move into the property.  It has now been set aside as an arts space and is under the management of the Dupont Underground.

The Colorado Avenue Terminal on 14th Street NW is still in use as a Metrobus stop. The Calvert Street loop just east of the Duke Ellington Bridge is still used as a Metrobus turnaround loop.

There was a streetcar station in the center of Barney Circle, but it was removed in the 1970s. The streetcar turnaround at 11th and Monroe NW is now the 11th and Monroe Streets Park.

Tunnels

The Dupont Circle streetcar station tunnel entrances, located where the medians of Connecticut Avenue NW now stand, north of N Street NW, and between R Street NW and S Street NW, were filled in and paved over in August 1964, leaving only the traffic tunnel.

The C Street NW/NE tunnel beneath the Upper Senate Park remained in use as a one-way service road adjacent to the Capitol, but since 9/11 it has been closed to the public.

The Bureau of Engraving and Printing underground loop is now part of a parking structure and storage area that is located directly underneath 14th Street SW. Tracks can still be seen in the floors in some locations of the Bureau.

Right-of-way

The right-of-way of the Glen Echo line is mostly extant from the Georgetown Car Barn all the way to the Dalecarlia Reservoir filtration plant in DC and from the District line to Cabin John in Maryland. The DC section includes an abutment near an entrance to Georgetown University, a trestle over Foundry Branch in Glover Archbold Park, the median of Sherier Place NW from Cathedral Avenue NW to Manning Place NW and a strip of land along most of the right-or-way. 

Part of the right-of-way on the Georgetown campus was removed in the spring of 2007 to create a turning lane off of Canal Road NW. Bridge #1 at Georgetown University was removed in 1976. The section from the aqueduct to Foxhall Road was purchased by the District of Columbia in the early 1980s to construct a crosstown watermain. 

In 1980 and 1981, the three other bridges along the right-of-way - Bridge #3 at Clark Place, Bridge #4 next to Reservoir Road, and Bridge #5 over Maddox Branch in Battery Kemble Park - were removed during the construction of the water main. Bridge #6 over the Little Falls Branch Valley was removed sometime prior to 2000. The wide median of Pennsylvania Avenue SE from the Capitol to Barney Circle was built in 1903 to serve as a streetcar right of way.  It now serves as urban greenspace.

Other remnants

Perhaps the most visible remnant of the streetcar system is the Metrobus system, run by the Washington Metropolitan Area Transit Authority (WMATA). On January 14, 1973, WMATA purchased DC Transit and the Washington, Virginia and Maryland Coach Company (followed on February 4 by the purchase of AB&W Transit Company and WMA Transit Company) unifying all the bus companies in D.C.

Many of today's WMATA's bus routes are only marginally changed from the streetcar lines they followed. For example, the #30 streetcar route that ran from Barney Circle to Friendship Heights is now the 30 bus line that runs from Anacostia through Barney Circle to Friendship Heights, and the #70 streetcar route to Brightwood is now the 70 bus that continues to run to Brightwood.  

Other remnants include the Potomac Electric Power Company, the electric portion of Washington Traction and Electric Company, which remains the D.C. area's primary electrical power company; some streetcar-related manhole covers that remain in use around town; and four tall lampposts for Capital Traction's overhead wires on the Connecticut Avenue Bridge over Klingle Valley in Cleveland Park. The poles likely date back to the bridge's construction in 1931.

The National Capital Trolley Museum holds in its archives an extensive collection of various artifacts from Washington's street car systems.

See also

 Streetcars in Washington, D.C., and Maryland
 Bustitution
 General Motors streetcar conspiracy
 National Capital Trolley Museum
 Trolley park
 Urban rail transit
 Washington Metro
 DC Streetcar

Notes

References
 Carlson et al. (1986), The Colorful Streetcars We Rode, Bulletin 125 of the Central Electric Railfans' Association, Chicago, Il.

Further reading

'

External links
  National Capital Trolley Museum
 Articles about street cars in Washington, DC | Ghosts of DC
 DC Streetcar Historic Photographs | DC.gov
 Washington, D.C. Trolleys | nycsubway.org (archived)

 
 
Defunct Washington, D.C., railroads
Interurban railways in Washington, D.C.
1862 establishments in Washington, D.C.
1962 disestablishments in Washington, D.C.
Electric railways in Washington, D.C.
Washington
Demolished buildings and structures in Washington, D.C.